Takuu (also Mortlock, Taku, Tau, or Tauu) is a Polynesian language from the Ellicean group spoken on the atoll of Takuu, near Bougainville Island. It is very closely related to Nukumanu and Nukuria from Papua New Guinea and to Ontong Java and Sikaiana from Solomon Islands.

Population
The Takuu language is spoken in Mortlock village on the Takuu atoll (Marqueen Islands) off the east coast of Bougainville in Papua New Guinea. Takuu lies about 250 km to the northeast of Kieta, capital of Bougainville. The atoll consists of about 13 islands, but most of the population lives on a small neighboring island named Nukutoa. The islands are inhabited by approximately, 400 people of Polynesian origin. The people who speak the Takuu language are known “the people of Takuu” or just Takuu. According to Ethnologue, there are about 1,750 speakers of the Takuu language.

Phonology

Consonants
{| class="wikitable" style="text-align: center;"
!
!Labial
!Alveolar
!Velar
!Glottal
|-
! Nasal
| 
| 
|
|
|-
! Stop
| 
| 
| 
|
|-
! Fricative
|  
| 
|
| 
|-
! Liquids
|
|  
|
|
|}
Takuu has eleven consonants: f, k, l, m, n, p, r, s, t, v, and h. Moyle states that the consonants containing stops consist of the letters, p, t and k. The consonants named fricatives are, f/v, s and h. The nasal consonants are m and n, the lateral consonant is, l, and the approximant is r. The labial consonants consist of p, f/v and m. The apical consonants consist of, t, s, n, l and r. The velar consonant is k and the glottal is h (Moyle 2011). According to Moyle, “there is a length distinction in the vowels and between single and geminate consonants that is phonemic and important for correct pronunciation.” Moyle states that these distinctions affect not only the vowel length but also the stress patterns when saying different words. Moyle says that very often will you find people who pronounce the same words with a vowel between those consonants. There are also expanded forms of different words when used in songs.

Vowels
According to Moyle (2011), the vowels that are in the Takuu language consist of, /a, e, i, o, u/.

He stated that the high vowels /u/ and /i/ are pronounced as glides /w/ and /j/ respectively, especially when they precede the low back vowel /a/, or when /u/ precedes /i/.

Grammar

Basic Word Order
The basic word order in the Takuu language is Subject-Object-Verb.

“Naa tama raa ku honusia ttai”. → The tide overtook the people.
“Aku karamata e ausia te au”. → The smoke is irritating my eyes.

Reduplication
The Takuu language also uses reduplication in their language. It mostly shows within their verbs. They use reduplication as a repeated action marker. The example below is to illustrate an example of some of the words in their language that uses reduplication. 
Example Verbs:
    kata     kata-kata         apuru    apurupuru
    laugh    laughing          sink     sinking

Moyle also states that, “In Takuu, most verbs agree in number with plural subjects by reduplicating the first syllable of the root. There are exceptions: some verbs have only one form. When the first syllable is reduplicated, the vowel is omitted, forming an initial geminate consonant. However, among older speakers, the syllable reduplication is retained. It is also routinely retained in singing to achieve a predetermined number of syllables in a poetic line. The basic patterns for reduplication are listed below.
Dig → “Keri”
Serve Drinks → “Taki”
Split in Half → “Vasi”
Plural forms → “Kkeri”, “Ttaki”, “Vvasi”
When the initial consonant is h, however, it changes to ff in plural form.
Break → “hati”
Fold → “hatu”
Shift → “hiti”
Swallow → “horo”
Overturn → “huri”
Plural forms → “ffati”, “ffatu”, “ffiti”, “fforo”, “ffuri”
Geminate consonants are used when the verb begins with a vowel.
Know → “iloa”, *Plural form → “illoa”
Verbs with three syllables beginning with a consonant and having r as the second consonant mark the plural form by changing that r to ll (Moyle, 2011).
Push → “tuureki”, *Plural form → “tulleki”
Call out → “karana”, *Plural form → “kallana”
In the case of verbs with initial consonant r, that too changes to l (Moyle, 2011).
Protect → “rorosi”, Plural form → “lollosi”
Find → “rave”
Plural form → “llave”
Reduplication is also a feature of sentences where the verb action relates to many or all the available items standing as subjects or objects.
“Maatau” → Fish with a handline.
“Mamattau” → Of many men fishing in that manner.
“Kape” → Lift up and remove with an implement.
“Kapekkape” → Lift and remove several items with an implement.

Numerals
The Takuu use a base-10 numeral counting system. The Takuu language has a unique counting system of words just like any other language in the world, but use different words for counting different things. The Takuu counting system doesn’t have one set of words, but many different sets of words. According to Richard Moyle’s research on the Takuu language, they have words for counting cardinals, coin money, net mesh, coconuts and stones, fish, length of ropes, length of woods, humans, and canoes. According to Moyle, the counting system of the Takuu language extends from 1 to 1000 (Moyle, 2011).

Vocabulary

Indigenous Vocabulary
Sell → “Taavi”
Sennit →“Kaha”
Shade → “Shade”
Severe → “Mahi”
Wavy → “Mana”
Way → “Ava”
War → “Uoo”

Comparative Vocabulary

Endangerment
While Takuu is not presently considered seriously endangered as it is vigorously spoken throughout the island, it is becoming increasingly threatened as an ever greater number of the island's inhabitants are leaving the island because of economic hardships and the impact of climate change and rising sea levels. Many of Takuu's younger generations living abroad no longer use Takuu in everyday conversation while the population of the island itself is becoming more and more depleted. Takuu activist Raroteone Tefuarani said that she was shocked when seeing the rapid loss of language and cultural identity among the Takuu population which had been resettled in Buka, Bougainville in 2012. As of 2016 there are only estimated to be a few hundred residents permanently living on Takuu.

Filming
In 2006 a team of filmmakers (Briar March and Lyn Collie) visited the atoll twice, “making a documentary that records culture and life on the atoll, and examines the possibility that the community might have to relocate to Bougainville mainland if their physical situation worsens”. The second shoot in 2008 was filmed by Scott Smithers and John Hunter. Their films helped people capture how the people of Takuu live their day-to-day lives. Briar, Lyn, Scott and John all discovered that the Takuu people reside in “traditional thatched houses that stand in crowded rows, so close to each other that the eaves almost touch. There are few trees on the island apart from coconut palms, and the main street serves as a marae, a space for ritual ceremonies”. Music is a fundamental part of their life and because of their “long periods of isolation”; many of the indigenous songs, stories and dances have survived till this day. This shows that the Takuu people place great value on their indigenous practices and religious belief. Although there are numerous churches established on Nukutoa, they did not seem to bother to push out their old culture for a new one, making them an independent culture. Just like how the Hawaiian language uses a danced called hula to tell stories, the Takuu use the musical side of their language to tell stories of “voyages between the islands, as well as celebrations of successful relationships, whether relationships that link extended families together, in productive activity or relationships binding people with their ancestors in time of need” through songs.

References

Further reading
Irwin, H. (1980). Takuu Dictionary. : A Polynesian language of the South Pacific. Canberra: Pacific Linguistics. 428pp. .

See also

Takuu Atoll

Languages of Papua New Guinea
Ellicean languages
Subject–object–verb languages
Endangered languages of Oceania